Gabriel Eduardo Sandoval Alarcón (born 13 March 1984), is a Chilean footballer who plays as a midfielder for Deportes Iberia in the Chilean Segunda División.

Career statistics

Honours

Club
Huachipato
 Clausura Tournament (1): 2012

References

 BDFA profile

External links
 
 

1984 births
Living people
People from Talcahuano
Chilean footballers
Chilean Primera División players
Primera B de Chile players
Segunda División Profesional de Chile players
C.D. Huachipato footballers
San Marcos de Arica footballers
Unión Española footballers
C.D. Antofagasta footballers
Cobreloa footballers
Rangers de Talca footballers
Independiente de Cauquenes footballers
Deportes Iberia footballers
Association football midfielders